Nebraska Highway 23 is a  highway in southwestern Nebraska, United States. Its western terminus is on the Colorado border at Venango, where the highway continues west as Colorado State Highway 23. The eastern terminus of NE 23 is at Holdrege at an intersection with U.S. Routes 6 and 34.

Route description
Nebraska Highway 23 begins at the Colorado border at Venango. It passes northeasterly through farmland towards Grant, where it meets Nebraska Highway 61. After a brief concurrency, NE 23 and NE 61 separate and NE 23 continues east. Near Wallace, NE 23 meets Nebraska Highway 25. It continues east and near Wellfleet, meets U.S. Route 83.  NE 23 turns south with US 83 and continues south until near Maywood, where they separate. After going east through Maywood, NE 23 continues east and meets Nebraska Highway 18 at Curtis. After a brief segment which runs northward, it passes Moorefield and continues on through Farnam. Near Farnam, NE 23 meets Nebraska Highway 47 and turns southeasterly. It passes through Eustis and meets Nebraska Highway 21. It continues southeasterly and meets U.S. Highway 283 in Elwood.  It continues in a southeastern direction through Smithfield, Bertrand, and Loomis and ends at an intersection with US Routes 6 and 34 at the western end of Holdrege.

Major intersections

See also

 List of state highways in Nebraska

References

External links

 The Nebraska Highways Page: Highways 1 to 30
 Nebraska Roads: NE 21-40

023
Transportation in Perkins County, Nebraska
Transportation in Lincoln County, Nebraska
Transportation in Frontier County, Nebraska
Transportation in Dawson County, Nebraska
Transportation in Gosper County, Nebraska
Transportation in Phelps County, Nebraska